Nirai Kanai is a mythical place in Ryukyuan religion.

Nirai Kanai may also refer to:
"Nirai Kanai" (Cocco song), a song by musician Cocco.
"Nirai Kanai" (MAX song), a music single by the band MAX.
A fictional location in the anime television series RahXephon
"Nirai-Kanai" (RahXephon episode), an episode of the same TV series.